Mark Singleton (1762 – 17 July 1840) was an Anglo-Irish politician.  He sat in the House of Commons of Great Britain as an MP for the borough of Eye from 1796 to 1799, in the Irish House of Commons in 1800 as the Member of Parliament (MP) for the rotten borough of Carysfort in County Wicklow, and then in the House of Commons of the United Kingdom as an MP for Eye from 1807 to 1820.

Singleton was the third son of Dublin lawyer Sydenham Singleton (formerly Fowke) and his wife Elizabeth Whyte, only daughter of the Dublin attorney Mark Whyte. He was educated at Christ Church, Oxford and at Lincoln's Inn. In 1785 and eloped with Lady Mary Cornwallis, daughter of Charles Cornwallis, 1st Marquess Cornwallis, but her father soon endorsed the marriage.

Despite qualifying as a barrister, Singleton turned to the British Army, becoming an ensign in the 1st Foot Guards in 1782. He later served as a major in the Suffolk volunteer cavalry, and a cornet in the Middlesex yeomanry.

Singleton owed his career to the patronage of his father-in-law. After a period as a socialite, Cornwallis's influence secured Singleton's parliamentary seats and his appointment in 1795 as Storekeeper of Ordnance.

References

External links 
 

1762 births
1840 deaths
18th-century Anglo-Irish people
19th-century Anglo-Irish people
Members of the Parliament of Great Britain for English constituencies
British MPs 1796–1800
Members of the Parliament of Ireland (pre-1801) for County Wicklow constituencies
Irish MPs 1798–1800
Members of the Parliament of the United Kingdom for English constituencies
UK MPs 1807–1812
UK MPs 1812–1818
UK MPs 1818–1820
Members of Lincoln's Inn
Grenadier Guards officers
Alumni of Christ Church, Oxford
Suffolk Yeomanry officers